In the Bible, Gad was the son of Jacob and the founder of the tribe of Gad. Gad is a surname, masculine given name and nickname which may refer to:

Given name
Gad al-Haq (1917-1996), Egyptian Grand Imam of Al-Azhar from 1982 to 1996
Gad Avigad (born 1930), Israeli biochemist
Gad Avrahami (born 1952), Israeli composer
Gad Barzilai (born 1958), Israeli professor of law, political science and international studies
Gad Frederik Clement (1867–1933), Danish painter generally known as G. F. Clement
Gad Elbaz (born 1982), Israeli singer
Gad Elmaleh (born 1971), Moroccan-French comedian and actor
Gad Granach (1915–2011), German writer 
Gad Horowitz (born 1936), Canadian political scientist and professor
Gad Landau (born 1954), Israeli computer scientist
Gad Lerner (born 1954), Italian journalist and writer
Gad Machnes (footballer) (born 1956), Israeli retired footballer and manager
Gad Machnes (politician) (1893-1954), Israeli orientalist and government official
Gad Navon (1922–2006), third Chief Military Rabbi of the Israel Defense Forces
Gad Rausing (1922–2000), Swedish industrialist and archaeologist
Gad Saad (born 1964), Lebanese-born Canadian evolutionary behavioral scientist
Gad Shimron (born 1950), Israeli journalist, author and military affairs commentator
Gad Tsobari (born 1944), Israeli freestyle wrestler and survivor of the 1972 Munich massacre
Gad Yaacobi (1935-2007), Israeli politician
Gad Zeevi (born 1939), Israeli industrialist

Surname
Cille Gad (1675-1711), Norwegian poet
Dodo Gad, lead singer of the Danish pop band Dodo and the Dodos
Dora Gad (1912-2003), Israeli interior designer
Emma Gad (1852-1921), Danish writer and socialite, mother of Urban Gad
Hubert Gad (1914-1939), Polish footballer
Hyakinthos Gad (1912–1975), Apostolic exarch of the Greek Byzantine Catholic Church from 1958 to 1975
Jens Gad (born 1966), German producer, songwriter and guitarist, brother of Toby Gad
Johannes Gad (1842–1926), German neurophysiologist
Josh Gad (born 1981), American actor, comedian and singer
Pablo Gad (fl. 1977 to present), British Roots reggae singer and songwriter
Toby Gad (born 1968), Los Angeles-based German music producer/songwriter, brother of Jens Gad
Urban Gad (1879–1947), Danish film director, son of Emma Gad

Nickname
Gerhard Gad Beck (1923–2012), German Jewish educator, author, activist and survivor of the Holocaust

Masculine given names